180 (one hundred [and] eighty) is the natural number following 179 and preceding 181.

In mathematics
180 is an abundant number, with its proper divisors summing up to 366. 180 is also a highly composite number, a positive integer with more divisors than any smaller positive integer. One of the consequences of 180 having so many divisors is that it is a practical number, meaning that any positive number smaller than 180 that is not a divisor of 180 can be expressed as the sum of some of 180's divisors. 180 is a Harshad number and a refactorable number.

180 is the sum of two square numbers: 122 + 62. It can be expressed as either the sum of six consecutive prime numbers: 19 + 23 + 29 + 31 + 37 + 41, or the sum of eight consecutive prime numbers: 11 + 13 + 17 + 19 + 23 + 29 + 31 + 37. 180 is an Ulam number, which can be expressed as a sum of earlier terms in the Ulam sequence only as 177 + 3.

180 is a 61-gonal number.

Half a circle has 180 degrees, and thus a U-turn is also referred to as a 180.

Summing Euler's totient function φ(x) over the first + 24 integers gives 180.

In binary it is a digitally balanced number, since its binary representation has the same number of zeros as ones (10110100).

In religion
The Book of Genesis says that Isaac died at the age of 180.

Other 

 All of the Final Destination series has used the number for death clues, starting off in the first film as a flight number to a 747 airliner based on TWA  Flight 800.
 180 is the highest score possible with three darts.

See also
 List of highways numbered 180
 United Nations Security Council Resolution 180
 United States Supreme Court cases, Volume 180
 Pennsylvania House of Representatives, District 180

References

External links

 
 

Integers